Rambabu Kumar Yadav is a Nepalese politician, belonging to the People's Socialist Party, Nepal currently serving as the member of the 1st Federal Parliament of Nepal. In the 2017 Nepalese general election he was elected from the Bara 3 constituency, securing 21336 (38.18%)  votes.

References

Nepal MPs 2017–2022
Living people
Madhesi Jana Adhikar Forum, Nepal politicians
People's Socialist Party, Nepal politicians
1975 births